Eliane Teresinha Giardini (born October 20, 1952) is a Brazilian actress. Although she had little career success until the age of forty, she is now considered one of Brazil's foremost actresses.

Biography

Giardini was born in Sorocaba, São Paulo.  Formerly married to actor Paulo Betti, she is the mother of two girls, Juliana and Mariana Betti, both actresses themselves.

Appearances

TV
 Ninho da Serpente (as Lídia)
 Campeão (as Cristina)
 Vida Roubada (as Hilda)
 Meus Filhos, Minha Vida
 Uma Esperança no Ar (as Débora)
 Helena (as Joana)
 Caso Verdade
 Desejo (as Lucinda)
 Felicidade (as Isaura)
 Renascer (as Dona Patroa/Yolanda)
 Incidente em Antares (as Eleutéria)
 A Comédia da Vida Privada (as Helena)
 Irmãos Coragem (as Estela)
 Engraçadinha (as Maria Aparecida)
 Você Decide
 Explode Coração (as Lola)
 A Indomada (as Santa Maria)
 Você Decide (as Sílvia)
 Mulher (as Anita)
 Hilda Furacão (as Berta)
 Torre de Babel (as Wandona)
 Andando nas Nuvens (as Janete)
 Você Decide (as Ana)
 O Belo e As Feras (as Ludmila)
 Zorra Total (as Maria Rosa / Roxana)
 Os Maias (as The Countess of Gouvarinho)
 Os Normais (as Marta)
 O Clone (as Nazira Rachid)
 A Casa das Sete Mulheres (as Caetana)
 Um Só Coração (as Tarsila do Amaral)
 América (as Viúva Neuta)
 JK (as Tarsila do Amaral)
 Cobras & Lagartos (as Eva/Esmeralda)
 Eterna Magia (as Pérola)
 Capitu (as Dona Glória Santiago)
 India – A Love Story (as Indira Ananda)
 Tempos Modernos (as Hélia Pimenta)
 Afinal, o Que Querem as Mulheres? (as Profª Noemi)
 Lara com Z (as Sandra Heibert)
 Avenida Brasil (as Muricy Araújo)
 Amor à Vida (as Ordália Vianna)

Movies
 O Salário da Morte
 O Amor Está no Ar
 Chatô
 Uma Vida Em Segredo
 Histórias do olhar
 Olga

External links
Official Fans Site

1952 births
Living people
People from Sorocaba
Brazilian people of Italian descent
Brazilian people of Portuguese descent
Brazilian film actresses
Brazilian telenovela actresses
University of São Paulo alumni